Franklin, California may refer to:
 Franklin, Los Angeles County, California
 Franklin, Merced County, California
 Franklin, Napa County, California
 Franklin, Sacramento County, California
 Franklin, San Joaquin County, California